The Miami Fury is a football team in the Women's Football Alliance. Based in Miami, Florida, the Fury plays its home games at Carter Park.

History

2000
The Fury was formed as a charter member of the Women's Professional Football League when it started full-league play in 2000 (previously, it had just been a barnstorming venture between the Lake Michigan Minx and the Minnesota Vixen).  The Fury were placed in the National Conference South Division alongside their in-state rivals the Daytona Beach Barracudas and the Tampa Tempest.  In their inaugural season, the Fury finished with a 3–4 record, in-between the undefeated Barracudas (6-0) and the winless Tempest (0-6).

2001
2001 was a much better year for the Fury, as the team started with a 3–1 record.  However, due to the September 11 attacks, the remainder of the regular season was cancelled, and despite four forfeit wins in the Fury's favor, they did not get a chance to compete for the Championship.  The official record books show 7-1 as the Fury's final record

2002
The Fury took the year off to reorganize and get ready for their move to the Independent Women's Football League.

2003
In their first season in the IWFL, the Fury finished with a 5–1 record which was good for the Eastern Conference South Atlantic Division title, finishing ahead of their rivals the Tampa Bay Terminators and Orlando Starz.  However, for undetermined reasons, the Fury forfeited their first-round playoff game to the Bay State Warriors.

2004 & 2005: The X-Team Years
In 2004 and 2005, the Fury played as an IWFL exhibition team ("X-Team").  Not much is known about their time in the X-Team circuit.

2006
2006 marked the Fury's return to full-time seasonal play.  They picked up right where they left off, finishing with a 7–1 record good for second place in the South Atlantic Division.  Unfortunately, their playoff run would end soon after it began after a 14–8 loss to their old WPFL rivals the New York Sharks in the first round.

2007
The Fury finished third place in the South Atlantic Division with a 3–5 record.

2008
Once again, the Fury finished third place in the South Atlantic Division with a 3–5 record.

2009
Yet again, the Fury finished third place in the South Atlantic Division, only this time with a 6–2 record.

2010
For the fourth consecutive season, the Fury finished third place in the Southeast Division, with a 5–3 record this time around.

2011
For the 2011 season, the Fury joined the Women's Football Alliance, joining the Jacksonville Dixie Blues, Gulf Coast Riptide, Orlando Anarchy, and Tampa Bay Pirates as teams representing the Sunshine State.  Also, longtime IWFL rival the Palm Beach Punishers made the move to the WFA.

That season proved to be a return to their dominant ways, winning the Coastal Division title with a 7–1 record (their first title since 2003) and reaching the playoffs for the first time since 2006.  However, their playoff run was as short-lived as before, losing to the Jacksonville Dixie Blues in the first round by a score of 20–18.

2018
Posted on April 7, 2018,
The Miami Fury kickoff its first game of the season on April 14. The first game will be on the road in Tampa, Florida at 7 PM. This year the team was able to bring back the majority of its veteran players while adding a few new rookies to the roster. It will definitely be an exciting and competitive season. Stay tuned for updates.

Dwyer Stacy 3 Fort Lauderdale, FL----- 
White Sherry 4 Fort Lauderdale, FL----
Cortes Jennifer 5 Miami, FL---- 
Wilson Lacharmer 6 Miami, FL---- 
Childers Jessica 7 Hallandale, FL---- 
Greeg Keondra 11 Miami, FL---- 
Matthews Jordean 13 Pleasantville, NJ---- 
Ballard Natrasha 15 Miami, FL---- 
Cofield Ternisha 19 Miami, FL---- 
Lee Courtney 20 Deerfield Beach, FL---- 
Villar Jenecil 21 Miami Springs, FL---- 
Frye Nadia 23 Loxahatchee, FL---- 
Sumlin Dianna 25 Fort Lauderdale, FL----
Swain Erica 28 Fort Lauderdale, FL---- 
Baptiste Sabrina 31 North Miami, FL---- 
Bernard Sasha 34 Delray Beach, FL---- 
Watson Alessandra 40 Miami, FL---- 
Brent-Harris Dionne 45 Miramar, FL---- 
Sharpe Quisqueya 60 Miami, FL---- 
Montanez Jessica 61 Miramar, FL---- 
Cardova Blanca 64 Miami, FL---- 
Haywood Michelle 65 Pembroke Pines, FL---- 
Wright Nicole 75 Miami, FL----  
Johnson Brittani 44 Fort Lauderdale, FL---- 
Rogers Danitra 92 Miami, FL---- 
McDonald Keisha 95 Miami, FL----

Season-By-Season 

|-
| colspan="6" align="center" | Miami Fury (WPFL)
|-
|2000 || 3 || 4 || 0 || 2nd NC South || --
|-
|2001 || 7 || 1 || 0 || 1st NC South || Playoffs Cancelled due to September 11 attacks
|-
|2002 || colspan="6" align="center" | Did Not Play
|-
| colspan="6" align="center" | Miami Fury (IWFL)
|-
|2003 || 5 || 1 || 0 || 1st EC South Atlantic || Forfeited Divisional Playoffs (Bay State)
|-
|2004 || colspan="6" rowspan="2" align="center" | X-Team: Results Unknown/Not Counted
|-
|2005 
|-
|2006 || 7 || 1 || 0 || 2nd EC South Atlantic || Lost EC First Round (New York)
|-
|2007 || 3 || 5 || 0 || 3rd EC South Atlantic || --
|-
|2008 || 3 || 5 || 0 || 3rd EC South Atlantic || --
|-
|2009 || 6 || 2 || 0 || 3rd EC South Atlantic || --
|-
|2010 || 5 || 3 || 0 || 3rd EC Southeast || --
|-
| colspan="6" align="center" | Miami Fury (WFA)
|-
|2011 || 7 || 1 || 0 || 1st NC Coastal || Lost National Conference Quarterfinal (Jacksonville)
|-
|2012 || 0 || 8 || 0 || 5th National Division 9 || 
|-
!Totals || 46 || 34 || 0
|colspan="2"| (including playoffs, not including X-Team seasons)

2011 roster

2009

Season Schedule

2010

Season Schedule

** = Won by forfeit
*** = Forfeited

2011

Standings

Season Schedule

2012

Season schedule

External links
 Miami Fury
 Miami Fury Football Fan Site

Women's Football Alliance teams
American football teams in Miami
American football teams established in 2000
2000 establishments in Florida
Women's sports in Florida